Lorraine and Barrois was a government of the Kingdom of France, formed in February 1766 from the duchies of Lorraine and Bar upon the death of Stanisław Leszczyński.

History

 

King Louis XV of France had negotiated at the preliminaries of Vienna in 1735 "an arrangement by which Francis [III, Duke of Lorraine] received the duchy of Tuscany [...] in exchange for Lorraine, and Stanislaus Leszczynski, the dethroned king of Poland and father-in-law of Louis XV., obtained Lorraine, which after his death would pass to his daughter—in other words, to France." The following year (1736), "by a secret agreement," Stanisław had "abandoned the financial administration of his estates to Louis XV. for a yearly subsidy." Both treaties, however, guaranteed the legislation of Lorraine and Barrois, "the privileges enjoyed by the three orders, and their common law and customs tariffs, which they retained until the French Revolution."

Meanwhile, the Three Bishoprics formed a little government.

Barrois mouvant (composed of the bailiwicks of Bar and Bassigny) was under the jurisdiction of the Parliament of Paris whereas Barrois non-mouvant (i.e. the Bailiwick of Saint-Mihiel) and Lorraine were subject to the Sovereign Court of Lorraine and Barrois, which became the Parliament of Nancy in 1776. There was also a chambre des comptes at Bar-le-Duc.

References

Sources
 
 

States and territories established in the 1760s
States and territories disestablished in the 1790s